Hasanabad (also Romanized as Ḩasanābād) is a village in Hasanabad Rural District, in the Central District of Ravansar County, Kermanshah Province, Iran. At the 2006 census, its population was 841, in 209 families.

References 

Populated places in Ravansar County